Danbury Local School District is a school district in Northwest Ohio. The school district serves students who live in the city, community, and township of Danbury Twp., Marblehead, and Lakeside located in Ottawa County.

Grades 9-12
Danbury High School.

Grades 5-8
Danbury Middle School.

Grades K-4
Danbury Elementary School.

External links
District Website

School districts in Ohio
Education in Ottawa County, Ohio